Lod (or fully vocalized ;  or ), also known as Lydda, is a city  southeast of Tel Aviv and  northwest of Jerusalem in the Central District of Israel. It is situated between the lower Shephelah on the east and the coastal plain on the west.

Lod is an ancient city, and Neolithic remains have been discovered there. It is mentioned few times in the Hebrew Bible and in the New Testament. Between the 5th century BCE and up until the late Roman period, the city was a prominent center for Jewish scholarship and trade. Around 200 CE, the city became a Roman colony and was renamed . Christian tradition identifies Lod as the 4th century martyrdom site of Saint George; the Greek Orthodox Church of Saint George located in the city is believed to house his remains. 

Following the Arab conquest of the Levant, Lod served as the capital of Jund Filastin; however, a few decades later, the seat of power was transferred to Ramla, and Lod slipped in importance. Under Crusader rule, the city was a diocese of the Latin rite and it remains a titular see to this day.

Lod underwent a major change in its population in the mid-20th century. Exclusively Palestinian Arab in 1947, Lod was part of the area designated for an Arab state in the United Nations Partition Plan for Palestine; however, in July 1948, the city was occupied by the Israel Defense Forces, and most of its Arab inhabitants were expelled in the 1948 Palestinian expulsion from Lydda and Ramle. The city was largely resettled by Jewish immigrants, most of them expelled from Arab countries. 

Today, Lod is one of Israel's mixed cities, with an Arab population of 30%. Lod is one of Israel's major transportation hubs. The main international airport, Ben Gurion Airport, is located 8 km (5 miles) north of the city. The city is also a major railway and road junction.

Biblical references
The Hebrew name Lod appears in the Hebrew Bible as a town of Benjamin, founded along with Ono by Shamed or Shamer (1 Chronicles 8:12; Ezra 2:33; Nehemiah 7:37; 11:35). In , it is mentioned as one of the cities whose inhabitants returned after the Babylonian captivity.

Islamic reference
The city also finds reference in an Islamic hadith as the location of the battlefield where the false messiah (al-Masih ad-Dajjal) will be slain before the Day of Judgment.

History

Neolithic
The first occupation was in the Neolithic period.

Chalcolithic
Occupation continued in the chalcolithic.

Early Chalcolithic
Pottery finds have dated the initial settlement in the area now occupied by the town to 5600–5250 BCE.

Bronze Age

Early Bronze
In the Early Bronze, the site was an important located within the central coastal plain, along the Nahal Ayyalon, between the Judean Shephelah and the Mediterranean coast. Other important nearby sites were Tel Dalit, Tel Bareqet, Khirbat Abu Hamid/Shoham North, Tel Afeq, Azor and Tel Aviv.

Early Bronze IB
Two architectural phases belong to the late EB I in Area B. The first phase had a mudbrick wall, while the late phase included a circulat stone structure. Later excavations have produced an occupation later, Stratum IV. It consists of two phases, Stratum IVb with mudbrick wall on stone foundations and rounded exterior corners. In Stratum IVa there was a mudbrick wall with no stone foundations, with imported Egyptian potter and local pottery imitations.

Another excavations revealed nine occupation strata. Strata VI-III belonged to Early Bronze IB. The material culture showed Egyptian imports in strata V and IV.

Early Bronze II
Occupationed continued into Early Bronze II with four strata (V-II). There was continuity in the material culture and indications of centralized urban planning.

Middle Bronze
Middle Bronze II
North to the tell were scattered MB II burials.

Late Bronze
The earliest written record is in a list of Canaanite towns drawn up by the Egyptian pharaoh Thutmose III at Karnak in 1465 BCE.

Iron Age
From the fifth century BCE until the Roman period, the city was a centre of Jewish scholarship and commerce. 

According to British historian Martin Gilbert, during the Hasmonean period, Jonathan Maccabee and his brother, Simon Maccabaeus, enlarged the area under Jewish control, which included conquering the city.

Roman period
The Jewish community in Lod during the Mishnah and Talmud era is described in a significant number of sources, including information on its institutions, demographics, and way of life. The city reached its height as a Jewish center between the First Jewish-Roman War and the Bar Kokhba revolt, and again in the days of Judah ha-Nasi and the start of the Amoraim period. The city was then the site of numerous public institutions, including schools, study houses, and synagogues. 

In 43 BC, Cassius, the Roman governor of Syria, sold the inhabitants of Lod into slavery, but they were set free two years later by Mark Antony. 

During the First Jewish–Roman War, the Roman proconsul of Syria, Cestius Gallus, razed the town on his way to Jerusalem in 66 CE. According to Josephus, "[he] found the city deserted, for the entire population had gone up to Jerusalem for the Feast of Tabernacles. He killed fifty people whom he found, burned the town and marched on". Lydda was occupied by Emperor Vespasian in 68 CE.

In the period following the destruction of Jerusalem in 70 CE, Rabbi Tarfon, who appears in many Tannaitic and Jewish legal discussions, served as a rabbinic authority in Lod.

During the Kitos War, 115–117 CE, the Roman army laid siege to Lod, where the rebel Jews had gathered under the leadership of Julian and Pappos. Torah study was outlawed by the Romans and pursued mostly in the underground. The distress became so great, the patriarch Rabban Gamaliel II, who was shut up there and died soon afterwards, permitted fasting on Ḥanukkah. Other rabbis disagreed with this ruling. Lydda was next taken and many of the Jews were executed; the "slain of Lydda" are often mentioned in words of reverential praise in the Talmud.

In 200 CE, emperor Septimius Severus elevated the town to the status of a city, calling it Colonia Lucia Septimia Severa Diospolis. The name Diospolis ("City of Zeus") may have been bestowed earlier, possibly by Hadrian. At that point, most of its inhabitants were Christian. The earliest known bishop is Aëtius, a friend of Arius.

Byzantine period

In December 415, the Council of Diospolis was held here to try Pelagius; he was acquitted. In the sixth century, the city was renamed Georgiopolis<ref>Yoram Tsafrir, Leah Di Segni, Judith Green, Tabula Imperii Romani Iudaea-Palestina: Eretz Israel in the Hellenistic, Roman and Byzantine Periods; Maps and Gazetteer, p. 171. Israel Academy of Sciences and Humanities, 1994; </ref> after St. George, a soldier in the guard of the emperor Diocletian, who was born there between 256 and 285 CE. 

The Church of St George is named for him.
The 6th-century Madaba map shows Lydda as an unwalled city with a cluster of buildings under a black inscription reading "Lod, also Lydea, also Diospolis". An isolated large building with a semicircular colonnaded plaza in front of it might represent the St George shrine.

Early Muslim period

After the Muslim conquest of Palestine by Amr ibn al-'As in 636 CE, Lod which was referred to as "al-Ludd" in Arabic served as the capital of Jund Filastin ("Military District of Palaestina") before the seat of power was moved to nearby Ramla during the reign of the Umayyad Caliph Suleiman ibn Abd al-Malik in 715–716. The population of al-Ludd was relocated to Ramla, as well. With the relocation of its inhabitants and the construction of the White Mosque in Ramla, al-Ludd lost its importance and fell into decay.

The city was visited by the local Arab geographer al-Muqaddasi in 985, when it was under the Fatimid Caliphate, and was noted for its Great Mosque which served the residents of al-Ludd, Ramla, and the nearby villages. He also wrote of the city's "wonderful church (of St. George) at the gate of which Christ will slay the Antichrist."

Crusader and Ayyubid period
The Crusaders occupied the city in 1099 and named it St Jorge de Lidde. It was briefly conquered by Saladin, but retaken by the Crusaders in 1191. For the English Crusaders, it was a place of great significance as the birthplace of Saint George. The Crusaders made it the seat of a Latin rite diocese, and it remains a titular see. It owed the service of 10 knights and 20 sergeants, and it had its own burgess court during this era.

In 1226, Ayyubid Syrian geographer Yaqut al-Hamawi visited al-Ludd and stated it was part of the Jerusalem District during Ayyubid rule.

Mamluk period

Sultan Baybars brought Lydda again under Muslim control by 1267–8. According to Qalqashandi, Lydda was an administrative centre of a wilaya during the fourteenth and fifteenth century in the Mamluk empire. Mujir al-Din described it as a pleasant village with an active Friday mosque.Moudjir ed-dyn, 1876, Sauvaire (translation), pp. 210-213  During this time, Lydda was a station on the postal route between Cairo and Damascus.al-Ẓāhirī, 1894, pp. 118-119

Ottoman period

In 1517, Lydda was incorporated into the Ottoman Empire as part of the Damascus Eyalet, and in the 1550s, the revenues of Lydda were designated for the new waqf of Hasseki Sultan Imaret in Jerusalem, established by Hasseki Hurrem Sultan (Roxelana), the wife of Suleiman the Magnificent.

By 1596 Lydda was a part of the nahiya ("subdistrict") of Ramla, which was under the administration of the liwa ("district") of Gaza. It had a population of 241 households and 14 bachelors who were all Muslims, and 233 households who were Christians. They paid a fixed tax-rate of 33,3 % on agricultural products, including wheat, barley, summer crops, vineyards, fruit trees, sesame, special product ("dawalib" =spinning wheels), goats and beehives, in addition to occasional revenues and market toll, a total of 45,000 Akçe. All of the revenue went to the Waqf.

The village appeared as Lydda, though misplaced, on the map of Pierre Jacotin compiled in 1799.

Missionary William M. Thomson visited Lydda in the mid-19th century, describing it as a "flourishing village of some 2,000 inhabitants, imbosomed in noble orchards of olive, fig, pomegranate, mulberry, sycamore, and other trees, surrounded every way by a very fertile neighbourhood. The inhabitants are evidently industrious and thriving, and the whole country between this and Ramleh is fast being filled up with their flourishing orchards. Rarely have I beheld a rural scene more delightful than this presented in early harvest ... It must be seen, heard, and enjoyed to be appreciated."

In 1869, the population of Ludd was given as: 55 Catholics, 1,940 "Greeks", 5 Protestants and 4,850 Muslims. In 1870, the Church of Saint George was rebuilt. In 1892, the first railway station in the entire region was established in the city. In the second half of the 19th century, Jewish merchants migrated to the city, but left after the 1921 Jaffa riots.

In 1882, the Palestine Exploration Fund's Survey of Western Palestine described Lod as "A small town, standing among enclosure of prickly pear, and having fine olive groves around it, especially to the south. The minaret of the mosque is a very conspicuous object over the whole of the plain. The inhabitants are principally Moslim, though the place is the seat of a Greek bishop resident of Jerusalem. The Crusading church has lately been restored, and is used by the Greeks. Wells are found in the gardens...."

British Mandate

From 1918, Lydda was under the administration of the British Mandate in Palestine, as per a League of Nations decree that followed the Great War. During the Second World War, the British set up supply posts in and around Lydda and its railway station, also building an airport that was renamed Ben Gurion Airport after the death of Israel's first prime minister in 1973.

At the time of the 1922 census of Palestine, Lydda had a population of 8,103 inhabitants; 7,166 Muslims, 11 Jews and 926 Christians, the Christians were 921 Orthodox, 4 Roman Catholics and 1 Melkite. This had increased by the 1931 census to 11,250;  10,002 Muslims, 28 Jews, 1,210 Christians and 10 Bahai, in a total of 2475 residential houses.

In 1945 Lydda had a population of 16,780; 14,910 Muslims, 1,840 Christians, 20 Jews and 10 classified as "other". Until 1948, Lydda was an Arab town with a population of around 20,000—18,500 Muslims and 1,500 Christians. In 1947, the United Nations proposed dividing Mandatory Palestine into two states, one Jewish state and one Arab; Lydda was to form part of the proposed Arab state.  In the ensuing war, Israel captured Arab towns outside the area the UN had allotted it, including Lydda.

State of Israel
1948 War

The Israel Defense Forces entered Lydda on 11 July 1948. The following day, under the impression that it was under attack, the 3rd Battalion was ordered to shoot anyone "seen on the streets". According to Israel, 250 Arabs were killed. Other estimates are higher: Arab historian Aref al Aref estimated 400, and Nimr al Khatib 1,700.Morris, 2004, p. 205 Morris writes: "[...] dozens of unarmed detainees in the mosque and church in the centre of the town were shot and killed."

During 1948, the population rose to 50,000 people as Arab refugees fleeing other areas made their way there. All but 700 to 1,056 were expelled by order of the Israeli high command, and forced to walk  to the Jordanian Arab Legion lines. Estimates of those who died from exhaustion and dehydration vary from a handful to 355.Holmes et al., 2001, p. 64. The town was subsequently sacked by the Israeli army. A disputed claim, advanced by scholars including Ilan Pappé, characterizes this as ethnic cleansing. The few hundred Arabs who remained in the city were not permitted to live in their own homes. They were soon outnumbered by the influx of Jewish refugees following the Holocaust who moved into the town from August 1948 onward, most of them from Arab countries. as a result of which Lydda became a predominantly Jewish town.Yacobi, 2009, p. 29.

Following the war, the city's biblical name, Lod, was readopted. 

Resettlement of Lod
The Jewish immigrants who settled Lod came in waves, first from Morocco and Tunisia, later from Ethiopia, and then from the former Soviet Union.  

2000s to 2010s
Although the city has been plagued by a poor image for decades, as of 2008 dozens of projects were under way to improve life in the city. New upscale neighbourhoods are expanding the city to the east, among them Ganei Ya'ar and Ahisemah. According to the Economist, a three-meter-high wall was erected in 2010 to separate Jewish and Arab neighbourhoods, and limits have been imposed on Arab building, whereas construction in the Jewish areas is promoted. Some municipal services, such as street lighting and rubbish collection, are only provided to Jewish areas. Violent crime in the Arab neighbourhoods of Lod is largely directed at other Arabs and revolves around family feuds over turf and honour crimes. In 2010, the Lod Community Foundation organised an event for representatives of bicultural youth movements, volunteer aid organisations, educational start-ups, businessmen, sports organizations, and conservationists who are working on programmes to better the city.

The city continues to influence the work of Israeli artists and thinkers, such as Dor Guez's 2009–2010 exhibit Georgeopolis'' at the Petach Tikva art museum.

2020s 

In May 2021, the city was put into a state of emergency over Arab riots during the 2021 Israel–Palestine crisis, during which a Jewish-Israeli man was killed in the city. On 11 May 2021, the Mayor of Lod, Yair Revivio, urged Prime Minister of Israel Benjamin Netanyahu to deploy Israel Border Police in the city, stating that the city had "completely lost control" and warning that the country was on the brink of "civil war". Netanyahu declared a state of emergency in Lod on 11 May, marking the first time since 1966 that Israel has used emergency powers over an Arab community. International media noted that both Jewish and Palestinian mobs were active in Lod, but the "crackdown came for one side" only.

Demographics
In the 19th century, Lod was an exclusively Muslim-Christian town, with an estimated 6,850 inhabitants, of whom approximately 2,000 (29%) were Christian.

According to the Israel Central Bureau of Statistics (CBS), the population of Lod in 2010 was 69,500 people.

According to the 2019 census, the population of Lod was counted to be 77,223, of which 53,581 people, comprising 69.4% of the city's population were classified as "Jews and Others", and 23,642 people, comprising 30.6% as "Arab".

Education
According to CBS, 38 schools and 13,188 pupils are in the city. They are spread out as 26 elementary schools and 8,325 elementary school pupils, and 13 high schools and 4,863 high school pupils. About 52.5% of 12th-grade pupils were entitled to a matriculation certificate in 2001.

Economy

The airport and related industries are a major source of employment for the residents of Lod. 

A Jewish Agency Absorption Centre (the main type of facility for handling Jewish immigrants arriving in Israel) is also located in Lod. According to CBS figures for 2000, 23,032 people were salaried workers and 1,405 were self-employed. The mean monthly wage for a salaried worker was NIS 4,754, a real change of 2.9% over the course of 2000. Salaried men had a mean monthly wage of NIS 5,821 (a real change of 1.4%) versus NIS 3,547 for women (a real change of 4.6%). The mean income for the self-employed was NIS 4,991. About 1,275 people were receiving unemployment benefits and 7,145 were receiving an income supplement.

Archaeology

A well-preserved mosaic floor dating to the Roman period was excavated in 1996 as part of a salvage dig conducted on behalf of the Israel Antiquities Authority and the Municipality of Lod, prior to widening HeHalutz Street. According to
Jacob Fisch, executive director of the Friends of the Israel Antiquities Authority, a worker at the construction site noticed the tail of a tiger and halted work. The mosaic was initially covered over with soil at the conclusion of the excavation for lack of funds to conserve and develop the site. The mosaic is now part of the Lod Mosaic Archaeological Center.

The Lod Community Archaeology Program, which operates in ten Lod schools, five Jewish and five Israeli Arab, combines archaeological studies with participation in digs in Lod.

Sports
The city's major football club, Hapoel Bnei Lod, plays in Liga Leumit (the second division). Its home is at the Lod Municipal Stadium. The club was formed by a merger of Bnei Lod and Rakevet Lod in the 1980s. Two other clubs in the city play in the regional leagues: Hapoel MS Ortodoxim Lod in Liga Bet and Maccabi Lod in Liga Gimel.

Hapoel Lod played in the top division during the 1960s and 1980s, and won the State Cup in 1984. The club folded in 2002. A new club, Hapoel Maxim Lod (named after former mayor Maxim Levy) was established soon after, but folded in 2007.

Notable people

Rabbi Akiva, Talmudic sage
Etti Ankri (born 1963), singer
Oshri Cohen (born 1984), actor
St George, Patron Saint of Beirut, Palestine, England, Russia, and Catalonia
George Habash (1926–2008), founder of the Popular Front for the Liberation of Palestine
Eliezer ben Hurcanus, Talmudic sage
Joshua ben Levi, Talmudic sage
Tamer Nafar (born 1979), rapper
Suhell Nafar, rapper
Rabbi Tarfon, Talmudic sage
Salim Tuama (born 1979), footballer
Sami Abu Shehadeh (born 1975), politician

Twin towns-sister cities
Lod is twinned with:
  Piatra Neamţ, Romania
 Kraljevo, Serbia

See also
Depopulated Palestinian locations in Israel
Operation Danny

References

Bibliography

 - Profile at Google Books

 

 (p. 392)
 
 

 
 

 (pp.49 −55)

External links

City council 
al-Lydd Palestine Remembered
Lydda (Lod), Jewish Agency for Israel
Survey of Western Palestine, Map 13: IAA,  Wikimedia commons

 
Holy cities
History of Israel by location
Cities in Central District (Israel)
Lydda
Ancient Jewish settlements of Judaea
Arab Christian communities in Israel
Hebrew Bible cities
New Testament cities
Mixed Israeli communities
Tribe of Benjamin